Godfrey Higgs (28 September 1907 – 26 May 1986) was a Bahamian sailor. He competed in the 5.5 Metre event at the 1952 Summer Olympics.

References

External links
 

1907 births
1986 deaths
Bahamian male sailors (sport)
Olympic sailors of the Bahamas
Sailors at the 1952 Summer Olympics – 5.5 Metre
Sportspeople from Nassau, Bahamas